The Samuel and Emma A. Ranshaw House is a historic building in North Liberty, Iowa, United States.  At the time this house was built in 1908, North Liberty was a small and prosperous farming community.  The Ranshaws engaged Iowa City architect-builder Bernard Wickham to design and construct this transitional Free Classic subtype of the Queen Anne style.  It is characterized by simple classical decorative details that were becoming popular in the early 20th-century, as opposed to the more elaborate elements of the Late Victorian style. It was a typical house that Wickham was building in this area.  The  farmstead on which it was built was surrounded by farm fields just to the west of the town.  Suburban development now surrounds the house on its  lot.  In addition to the house, a concrete sidewalk and cistern cap with inlaid glass marbles that are set in geometric and floral patterns is included in the nomination.  They were listed on the National Register of Historic Places in 2012.

References

Houses completed in 1908
Queen Anne architecture in Iowa
Houses in Johnson County, Iowa
National Register of Historic Places in Johnson County, Iowa
Houses on the National Register of Historic Places in Iowa